Saerom-dong (새롬동) is neighborhood of Sejong City, South Korea.

References

Neighbourhoods in Sejong City